William S. Key Correctional Center is a minimum-security state prison for men located in Fort Supply, Woodward County, Oklahoma, owned and operated by the Oklahoma Department of Corrections.  

The facility was opened in 1989 and has a capacity of 1087 inmates held at minimum security. It was named after Warden of Oklahoma State Penitentiary and Major general William S. Key.

References

Prisons in Oklahoma
Buildings and structures in Woodward County, Oklahoma
1988 establishments in Oklahoma